The women's 4 × 200 metre freestyle relay event at the 2020 Summer Olympics was held in 2021 at the Tokyo Aquatics Centre. It was the event's seventh consecutive appearance, having been held at every edition since 1996.

Summary 
In one of the most unexpected results at these Games, the Chinese women's team pulled off an enormous upset from the favoured Australian team, taking more than a second off Australia's previous world record. China's Yang Junxuan led off the Chinese quartet in a national record of 1:54.37, holding off Australia's 200 freestyle Olympic champion Ariarne Titmus (1:54.51). Though continuing to trade the lead with Australia in the next two legs, Tang Muhan (1:55.00), Zhang Yufei (1:55.66) and Li Bingjie (1:55.30) ultimately combined to register a gold-medal time of 7:40.33. As the Chinese celebrated their surprise victory, Yufei also added the relay gold to her individual triumph in the 200 butterfly earlier in the session.

The U.S.' Allison Schmitt (1:56.34), Paige Madden (1:55.25) and Katie McLaughlin (1:55.38) moved themselves to third place on the penultimate leg but were still 1.53 seconds behind the second-placed Australian team. However, a sterling anchor split of 1:53.76 from Katie Ledecky ensured the defending Olympic champions a silver medal in an American Record of 7:40.73. Meanwhile, Australia's Titmus, Emma McKeon (1:55.31) and Madison Wilson (1:55.62) finished second in their respective legs but their anchor Leah Neale (1:55.81) could not keep off Ledecky towards a close finish, leaving the Australians with a bronze in an Oceanic Record of 7:41.29.

Canada's Summer McIntosh (1:55.74), Rebecca Smith (1:57.30), Kayla Sanchez (1:55.59) and Penny Oleksiak (1:55:14) slipped off the podium to fourth in a national record of 7:43.77. Meanwhile, ROC (7:52.15), Germany (7:53.89), Hungary (7:56.62) and France (7:58.15) rounded out the championship field.

The medals for competition were presented by Richard W. Pound, IOC member, and the gifts were presented by Antonio Silva, FINA Bureau Member.

Records
Prior to this competition, the existing world and Olympic records were as follows.

The following record was established during the competition:

Qualification

 
The top 12 teams in this event at the 2019 World Aquatics Championships qualified for the Olympics. An additional 4 teams qualified through having the fastest times at approved qualifying events during the qualifying period (1 March 2019 to 30 May 2020).

Competition format

The competition consists of two rounds: heats and a final. The relay teams with the best 8 times in the heats advance to the final. Swim-offs are used as necessary to break ties for advancement to the next round.

Schedule
All times are Japan Standard Time (UTC+9)

Results

Heats
A total of sixteen countries qualified to participate. The best eight from two heats advanced to the final.

Final

References

Women's 4 x 200 metre freestyle relay
Olympics
Women's events at the 2020 Summer Olympics
2021 in women's swimming